A total lunar eclipse will take place on January 12, 2047.

Visibility

Related lunar eclipses

Lunar year series

Half-Saros cycle
A lunar eclipse will be preceded and followed by solar eclipses by 9 years and 5.5 days (a half saros). This lunar eclipse is related to two annular solar eclipses of Solar Saros 132.

See also
List of lunar eclipses and List of 21st-century lunar eclipses

Notes

External links

2047-01
2047-01
2047 in science